A Little Coaxing is an oil painting by the French artist William-Adolphe Bouguereau, painted and completed in 1890, and now owned by a private collector.

It depicts two barefooted sisters, the older girl sitting on a concrete step and the younger sister giving her a kiss on the cheek.

References

Paintings by William-Adolphe Bouguereau
1890 paintings
Portraits of women
Children in art
Allegorical paintings by French artists
19th-century allegorical paintings